Mrinal Sen (Bengali: মৃণাল সেন; 14 May 1923 – 30 December 2018) was an Indian film director, and screenwriter known for his work primarily in Bengali, and few Hindi and Telugu language films. Regarded as one of the finest Indian filmmakers, along with his contemporaries Satyajit Ray, Ritwik Ghatak, and Tapan Sinha, Sen played major role in the New Wave cinema of eastern India.

Sen has received various national and international honors including eighteen Indian National Film Awards. The Government of India honored him with the Padma Bhushan, and the Government of France honored him with the Ordre des Arts et des Lettres, while Russian Government honored him with the Order of Friendship. Sen was also awarded the Dadasaheb Phalke Award, the highest award for filmmakers in India. 

He was one of the few Indian filmmakers having won awards at the big three film festivals viz., Cannes, Venice and the Berlinale. Sen was a self described "private Marxist".

Influence 
He directed Bhuvan Shome (Mr. Shome, 1969) which initiated the "New Wave Cinema Movement" in India.

Film craft, Social context and its political influence
The films that he made next were essentially political, and earned him the reputation as a Marxist artist. This was also the time of large-scale political unrest throughout India. Particularly in and around Calcutta, this period underwent what is now known as the Naxalite movement. This phase was immediately followed by a series of films where he shifted his focus, and instead of looking for enemies outside, he looked for the enemy within his own middle class society. This was arguably his most creative phase.

Depiction of Kolkata
In many Mrinal Sen movies from Punascha (1961) to Mahaprithivi (1992), Kolkata features prominently. He has shown Kolkata as a character, and as an inspiration. He has beautifully woven the people, value system, class difference and the roads of the city into his movies and coming of age for Kolkata, his El-Dorado.

Recognition

In 1982 he was a member of the jury at the 32nd Berlin International Film Festival. In 1983 he was a member of the jury at the 13th Moscow International Film Festival. In 1997 Sen became the member of the jury at the 20th Moscow International Film Festival.
On 24 July 2012, Sen was not invited to the function organised by West Bengal government to felicitate film personalities from the State. As per reports, his political views are believed to be the reason for his omission from the function.

Death
Sen had had age-related ailments for many years. He died on 30 December 2018 at the age of 95 at his home in Bhawanipore, Kolkata. The cause was a heart attack.

Awards

National Film Awards
Best Feature Film
1969: Bhuvan Shome
1974: Chorus
1976: Mrigayaa
1980: Akaler Sandhane

Second Best Feature Film
1972: Calcutta 71
1980: Kharij

Best Direction
1969: Bhuvan Shome
1979: Ek Din Pratidin
1980: Akaler Sandhane
1984: Khandhar

Best Screenplay
1974: Padatik
1983: Akaler Sandhane
1984: Kharij

Special Mention
1978: Parashuram

Best Regional Film Awards
Best Feature Film in Bengali
1961: Punascha
1965: Akash Kusum
1993: Antareen

Best Feature Film in Telugu
1977: Oka Oori Katha

Filmfare Awards

International awards
4th International Film Festival of India - Jury Prize - Bhuvan Shome - 1969

Berlin International Film Festival

State and institutional honors
In 1979, he was awarded the Nehru Soviet Land Award by the Union of Soviet Socialist Republics for his contribution to world cinema.
In 1981, the Government of India awarded Sen with the Padma Bhushan.
In 1985, President François Mitterrand, the President of France, awarded him the Commandeur de Ordre des Arts et des Lettres (Commander of the Order of Arts and Letters)
In 1993, he was awarded an honorary D.Litt. by the University of Burdwan.
In 1996, he was awarded an honorary D.Litt. by Jadavpur University.
In 1999, he was awarded an honorary D.Litt. by Rabindra Bharati University.
Between 1998 and 2003, he was made an Honorary Member of the Indian Parliament in the Rajya Sabha.
In 2000, President Vladimir Putin of the Russian Federation honored him with the Order of Friendship.
In 2005, the Dadasaheb Phalke Award, the highest honor given to an Indian filmmaker, was awarded to him by the Government of India for the year 2003.
In 2009, he was awarded an List of University of Calcutta honorary degree recipients honorary D. Litt. by the University of Calcutta.
In 2017, he was inducted as a member of the Oscar Academy

Filmography
Raat Bhore (The Dawn) (1955)
Neel Akasher Neechey (Under the Blue Sky) (1959)
Baishey Shravana (Wedding Day) (1960)
Punascha (Over Again) (1961)
Abasheshe (And at Last) (1963)
Pratinidhi (The Representative) (1964)
Akash Kusum (Up in the Clouds) (1965)
Matira Manisha (Man of the Soil) (Odia film) (1966)
Bhuvan Shome (Mr. Bhuvan Shome) (1969)
Interview (1971)
Ek Adhuri Kahani (An Unfinished Story) (1971)
Calcutta 71 (1972)
Padatik (The Guerilla Fighter) (1973)
Chorus (1974)
Mrigayaa (The Royal Hunt) (1976)
Oka Oori Katha (The Outsiders) (1977)
Parashuram (The Man with the Axe) (1978)
Ek Din Pratidin (And Quiet Rolls the Dawn) (1979)
Akaler Sandhane (In Search of Famine) (1980)
Chalchitra (The Kaleidoscope) (1981)
Kharij (The Case Is Closed) (1982)
Khandhar (The Ruins) (1983)
Genesis (1986)
Kabhi Door Kabhi Paas (1986–87) (12 short films made for television broadcast)
Ek Din Achanak (Suddenly, One Day) (1989)
Mahaprithibi (World Within, World Without) (1991)
Antareen (The Confined) (1993)
Aamaar Bhuvan (This, My Land) (2002)

References

Notes

External links
  
 
 Mrinal Sen 
 Mrinal Sen at the Encyclopædia Britannica

Indian autobiographers
Bengali film directors
Bengali Hindus
20th-century Indian film directors
Indian documentary filmmakers
Film directors from Kolkata
Scottish Church College alumni
University of Calcutta alumni
1923 births
2018 deaths
Recipients of the Padma Bhushan in arts
People from Faridpur District
Indian memoirists
Dadasaheb Phalke Award recipients
Commandeurs of the Ordre des Arts et des Lettres
Nominated members of the Rajya Sabha
Kalakar Awards winners
Best Director National Film Award winners
21st-century Indian film directors
Best Original Screenplay National Film Award winners
Special Mention (feature film) National Film Award winners
Producers who won the Best Feature Film National Film Award
Directors who won the Best Feature Film National Film Award